Mohenjo Daro is a 2016 Indian Hindi-language period action-adventure film written and directed by Ashutosh Gowariker. Produced by Siddharth Roy Kapur for UTV Motion Pictures and The Walt Disney Company India and Sunita Gowariker for Ashutosh Gowariker Productions (AGPPL), and starring Hrithik Roshan and Pooja Hegde. It is a cinematic presentation based on the ancient Indus Valley civilization, and its city Mohenjo-daro, a UNESCO World Heritage Site.

Set in 2016 BC at the height of Indus Valley Civilization, the story follows a farmer Sarman (Hrithik Roshan), who travels to the city of Mohenjo Daro and falls in love with a high-status woman (Pooja Hegde), and who must then challenge the city's elite, and fight against overwhelming odds to save their civilization. Gowariker took over three years to research and develop the script, working closely with archaeologists to ensure authenticity in the representation of his fictional story. The film was shot in Bhuj and Mumbai with brief schedules in Bhedaghat (Jabalpur) and Thane.

The score and soundtrack are composed by A. R. Rahman with lyrics penned by Javed Akhtar. The film was released worldwide on 12 August 2016. The film underperformed at box office.

Mohenjo Daro marks the last film production of UTV Motion Pictures, as two Disney releases, Dangal and Jagga Jasoos, became producer Kapur's final projects under the Disney·UTV brand before his contract with the company lapsed on 1 January 2017; the non-Hindi versions of both films were nonetheless presented by the banner, while Jagga Jasoos faced delays before its release in mid-July 2017.

Plot
The film opens in 2016 BCE with Sarman (Hrithik Roshan), a young man from the village of Amri, who lost his parents at a young age. Sarman kills a crocodile that has been terrorizing his village's fishermen and is hailed as a hero. He asks his uncle, Durjan (Nitish Bharadwaj), to allow him to go to Mohenjo Daro to trade their family's goods, but his uncle refuses. Sarman attempts to sneak away to the city at night with his friend Hojo (Umang Vyas), but is caught by Durjan, who relents and allows both friends to go. He gives Sarman a seal that contains an inscription of a unicorn that Sarman often sees in his dreams, suggesting he use it only once in a life or death situation.

Arriving in Mohenjo Daro, Sarman learns that the city is ruled by the tyrannical Senate Chief Maham (Kabir Bedi) and his wicked son Moonja (Arunoday Singh). He also learns that the unicorn he sees in his dreams is the symbol of the city, and feels as if the city is oddly familiar to him. While Sarman is trading, Maham proposes to impose an additional tax on the farmers so that the city may grow, but Sarman leads the farmers to oppose the taxes so that their families don't starve to death. Sarman gains access to the upper city by showing his uncle's amulet and meets Chaani (Pooja Hegde), the elegant and gorgeous daughter of the head priest (Manish Choudhary) of Mohenjo Daro. Sarman is enchanted by Chaani's heavenly beauty and charm and falls in love with her.  Upon meeting, the head priest strangely appears to recognize Sarman. Chaani reveals that she has been forcibly betrothed to Moonja, Sarman's enemy, who is cruel and ruthless. Maham discovers Sarman and Chaani love each other and that Sarman is the leader of the tax revolt, and so he challenges Sarman to fight Bakar and Zokar, his two champions. Sarman proposes that if he wins, Chaani will be released from her engagement, and Maham accepts the terms.

On the night before Sarman's clash with Bakar and Zokar, the head priest reveals to him how Maham was expelled from Harappa for illegal trade with the Sumerians. Maham entered Mohenjo Daro as a trader and quickly rose to become the trade chief. Maham had discovered that the mighty Sindhu River held vast gold deposits, so he decided to place a dam on the river and divert its course to mine the gold. The wise Senate Chief Srujan (Sharad Kelkar), who is revealed to be Sarman's father, opposed this, but Maham won the vote to build the dam. He had Srujan framed and arrested for hoarding gold. Chaani's father and Durjan – Sarman's uncle – were coerced by Maham to betray Srujan, and the latter was killed. Maham then took Srujan's place as the new Senate Chief. It is now up to Sarman to defeat the evil Maham and avenge his father.

In the arena outside the city, Sarman faces the ferocious Tajik mountain cannibals Bakar and Zokhar. After a vicious battle, he kills one of the cannibals but spares the other, and the people of Mohenjo Daro surge even stronger behind him. Enraged, Maham urges Moonja to finish off Chaani and the priest. Moonja kills the priest, but Sarman saves Chaani and kills Moonja.

Sarman exposes Maham's plan to use the gold from the Sindhu to enrich himself and to smuggle in weapons from the Sumerians. All the chiefs now stand against Maham. The people elect Sarman as the new chief, but Sarman suggests Mohenjo Daro needs a people's government, not a chief. With the arrival of a heavy thunderstorm, Sarman realizes that the dam will burst and the Sindhu River will flood the city. He rallies the people to lash boats together and form a floating bridge. They evacuate Mohenjo Daro and cross to the other side of the river. The dam collapses, and Maham, chained in the city square, is drowned. The once renowned Mohenjo Daro is no more. The survivors migrate to another river, where Sarman sees the unicorn of his dreams and names the river Ganga.

Cast

 Hrithik Roshan as Sarman, Chaani's love interest
 Pooja Hegde as Chaani, the Priest's daughter and Sarman's love interest
 Kabir Bedi as Maham Ramani, the Senate chief
 Arunoday Singh as Moonja, Maham's son
 Suhasini Mulay as Laashi, Maham's wife
 Nitish Bharadwaj as Durjan, Sarman's uncle
 Kishori Shahane as Bima, Sarman's aunt
 Sharad Kelkar as Srujan, Sarman's father
 Jividha Sharma as Rami, Srujan's wife, and Sarman's mother 
 Manish Choudhary as the Priest, Chaani's father
 Narendra Jha as Jakhiro, the mad man and a former member of Srujan's council
Shaji Chaudhary as Kulka
 Tufail Khan Rigoo as Ishme Dagan, the Sumerian
 Diganta Hazarika as Lothar, The Guard
 Naina Trivedi as Junu, Chaani's friend
 Shyraa Roy as Mohini
 Umang Vyas as Hojo, Sarman's friend
 Casey Frank as Bakar
 Mike Homik as Zokar

Production

Development
Director Ashutosh Gowariker was first inspired to make a film set in the ancient Indus Valley civilization when he was in Bhuj, Gujarat, scouting locations for his then-upcoming Lagaan (2001), and stumbled across the massive excavations in progress at the ruins of Dholavira:  "I thought, My God!  This is incredible!  What happened to this civilization, who were the people, how did they live?"

Several other films projects later, Gowariker announced the film Mohenjo Daro officially in February 2014 with A. R. Rahman composing the film score.

On taking up the project, in an interview, Gowariker stated that there was meagre and superficial information available about the people in that civilisation, particularly about their lifestyle, food, and feelings. The lack of information about the period troubled Gowariker, and he decided that whenever he would get a story to tell, it will be depicted circa 2500 BC at Mohenjo-daro which, despite being the largest city yet discovered from that ancient civilization, is today known only by the name—which translates as "Mound of the Dead" in English—ascribed by the Sindhi locals to the site when its ruins were discovered in 1922. "Mohenjo Daro" is not only the official name associated with that ancient city by the United Nations (as a World Heritage Site since 1980), but also the only name associated with it by archaeologists and historians around the world, as well as the general public. Thus, regardless of the literal translation of the words, "Mohenjo Daro" was the only possible title for an audience to identify with the actual reference point despite the fact that the city could have not been so named in ancient times.

On the film's plot, he was quoted as saying, "While the plot will follow Mohenjo-daro and the culture and the vibe of the ancient civilization, it will largely centre on a love story." It took Gowariker three years to piece together a plot of the entire civilisation through various cities and weave a love story into it.

The challenges of adapting for cinema a story based on one of the greatest ancient civilisations of the world whose written language has not yet been deciphered have proved unique. Because modern science can not yet read anything the Indus Valley peoples wrote about themselves, any aspect about their civilization has to be conjectured from what relics survive to discovery by archaeologists working at their various ruins. As The Indian Express pointed out, "whatever we do know about Mohenjo-daro is perhaps as much an imagination of the historian as that of a filmmaker who depicts it in visual terms."

During Ashutosh Gowariker's research, he met as many as seven archaeologists who are closely involved in excavating sites and studying the Indus Valley Civilization. After much reading of published archaeological reports on his own, he brought in the American archaeologist Jonathan Mark Kenoyer of the University of Wisconsin–Madison, considered one of the world's leading experts on the ancient Indus Valley civilization, who has worked at the ruins of Mohenjo-Daro over 35 years. He brought together Kenoyer to round-table with five other expert archaeologists who have also been working on this topic for many years—P. Ajit Prasad, V. N. Prabakhar, K. Krishnan, Vasant Shinde, and R. S. Bisht, "who are all from the Archaeological Survey of India, Maharaja Sayajirao University of Baroda and other institutions, all with expertise in different aspects of the same civilization." Gowariker had also personally revisited the archaeological dig at Dholavira in Gujarat.

Kenoyer later visited Bhuj to inspect and approve the sets and props built by the filmmakers.

The symbol ultimately selected for the film Mohenjo Daro recalls one of the earliest discovered artifacts from the initial archaeological excavations at the ruins of the ancient city itself: 'Another [seal] shows six animal heads—"unicorn", bison, antelope, tiger, the remaining two broken—radiating from a ring, and recalling a whorl on another seal from the same site with a single "unicorn" and five featureless lobes', the "unicorn" being one of the 'most frequently represented' animals portrayed among the 'over 1,200 of them [seals] [which] have been found at Mohenjo-daro alone'. The filmmaker has chosen to identify the "unicorn" with his central character.

The broadest artistic license required in bringing the Indus Valley civilization to the cinema, inevitably, would be costuming. Because although "undisputed traces of cotton cloth have survived at Mohenjo-Daro" and the Indus culture is believed by archaeologists to have pioneered the cultivation of cotton for clothmaking in the ancient world, no actual samples of finished clothing or other organic matter have survived over these four thousand years, due to the "damp alkalkine soil" prevailing at the Indus sites. Thus, the only reference material is the relative handful (compared with the broad abundance of seals found, or commercial items such as weights and measures) of terracotta humanoid figurines or small stone statues found at various excavations, which are mostly only partially intact and of mostly unknown purpose—but male or female, are mostly naked. Some of the female figures, for instance, wear elaborate headdresses and jewellery but little else. Explained the director in an interview, "I cannot make a movie with so much nudity, obviously. So I had to create and imagine a costume which will be away from all the different styles that we have seen in other movies, and yet be special for this civilization."

With the film being set in a certain period, the whole site had to be recreated in a film studio. He was involved in working out the logistics during June 2014. The film's stunts were choreographed by Glenn Boswell and the costumes were designed by April Ferry and Neeta Lulla. U.K. based trainer Joshua Kyle Baker was roped in to train Roshan for his character in the film. He described the three-month training so as to allow Roshan to appear 'lithe' and 'agile' rather than muscular. Relating the natural environment required for Mohenjo Daro, Gowariker was impressed with the calamitous VFX seen in the films The Day After Tomorrow and 10,000 BC that were designed by Karen Goulekas. In September 2014, as a visual effects supervisor, Goulekas was brought on board for the film. Gowariker revisited Bhuj in December 2014 to begin production.

Casting

In August 2014, Hrithik Roshan, who had starred in Ashutosh Gowariker's critically and commercially successful Jodhaa Akbar in 2008, was confirmed to play the male lead role again for Mohenjo Daro. He reportedly demanded . Said the director, "I wouldn't have made the film, without Hrithik." "[T]his is a different world, and I thought only Hrithik would blend in perfectly."

Telugu and Tamil cinema actress Pooja Hegde was signed as the female lead, and makes her Hindi film debut with Mohenjo Daro. "While scripting the film, I was thinking that I needed someone with innocence and someone who did not have stardom baggage [to be received by the audience only as this character]. I thus began looking for a fresh face when Sunita (Gowariker) spotted Pooja in a commercial and suggested that we call her.  She called Pooja and I auditioned her. And that was it!"

Veteran actor Kabir Bedi was signed as the primary villain, backed by Arunoday Singh as the younger villain.

For supporting roles, casting director, Nalini Rathnam wanted to bring in newer and fresh faces, even from non-Hindi speaking regions. As the director explained this process, "All kinds of actors, including seasoned actors, never get a chance to come to Mumbai or they don't want to as they are happy in their own space. So there is a different kind of freshness there to get them on board. I did this in Lagaan and Jodhaa Akbar. In this film too, I wanted to get some fresh actors, so I have Diganta Hazarika, who is a well-known Assamese actor. It is a time-consuming process but the payoff big."

Since action, as well as romance, are key to his story, perfectionist director Ashutosh Gowariker went to great lengths in casting to ensure his vision reaches the screen.

For example, for one specific action sequence, the director auditioned nearly 300 candidates before finally casting the two giant barbarian fighters who are more than 7 feet tall, in order to make the sequence thrilling and visually appealing when presented to the audience opposite his 6-foot-tall hero.

To populate his recreation of the ancient city, for Mohenjo Daro director, Ashutosh Gowariker naturally required a huge number of non-actors as extras. With the full cooperation of the Bhuj panchayat or community council, the filmmakers hosted full-fledged auditions for all the local residents. Many of those seen on-screen in cityscapes and group scenes throughout Mohenjo Daro are in their real-life local citizens of Bhuj.

Pre-production

Construction of the primary outdoor sets to be used in recreating the ancient city duly commenced in Bhuj, Gujarat, near where director Ashutosh Gowariker had shot his early film, Lagaan (2001).

As AGPPL producer Sunita Gowariker recounted their initial dialogue when Ashutosh Gowariker decided Mohenjo Daro as his next project, her immediate response was that the city does not exist any more, how would they shoot the film. To which Ashutosh responded:  "We put up the whole city!" The film sets ultimately built to recreate the ancient city of Mohenjo-Daro spanned more than 25 acres.

Painstaking effort was made to ensure precise accuracy of the city's film set construction, matching its proportions and architecture to the actual archaeological ruins. The famous Great Bath, for instance, is built exactly to scale, as are the houses in the film. To quote lead actress Pooja Hegde, "The sets were so detailed that once we stepped onto them, you were enveloped by the ambience. Ashu sir's detailing is so great that if there's a mashal, the wall behind it would be blackened to resemble soot. Whenever I stepped onto the sets, I automatically got into the mood ... Ashu sir made you feel like you were already there."

However, construction was delayed in mid-September 2014, when workers belonging to Allied Mazdoor Union and Film Studio Setting refused to complete the pre-production work, alleging non-payment of their regular expenses and remuneration. To this stalled situation, Gowariker took a legal route and lodged a complaint with the 'Indian Film and Television Producers Council' accusing the members of stalling work that would result in losses to the company. Lawrence D'Souza, the executive producer of the film, maintained that though their payments were ready, the remote filming locations of Bhuj delayed the reception of the same.

Ayananka Bose had originally been signed as the cinematographer. Still, when the film was delayed, he took up other projects as he was paid on a project-to-project basis. Bose failed to join the discussions prior to filming and requested Gowariker to be allowed to join the set directly after he was done with his other commitments. A displeased Gowariker replaced Bose with C. K. Muraleedharan.

The initial outdoor schedule of principal photography had been projected to begin in November 2014.  However, the further delay occurred when lead actor Hrithik Roshan ripped apart his shoulder during training in late October 2014. Because Mohenjo Daro was a physically demanding film with challenging action sequences that were to be shot starting with the very first schedule, and no body doubles were to be used, producer-director Ashutosh Gowariker postponed the shoot six weeks until January 2015. Confirming this delay, producer Sunita Gowariker of AGPPL stated, "Ashutosh and I want Hrithik to recuperate fully before beginning the film, since we plan to start with action sequences. Now we will start shooting in the first week of January. It is important to us that Hrithik is 100% fit, and shifting the shooting dates by a few weeks makes a lot of sense."

Filming
Principal photography commenced in Bhuj on 27 January 2015. But the demanding action sequences needed by the film took a hard physical toll on the cast which resulted in delays due to injury, especially when an accident involved the lead actor, Hrithik Roshan, who was required for the maximum number of scenes. For instance, shooting was delayed for several days in March 2015, when Hrithik sprained his neck during a fight sequence. The first schedule of 101 days nonetheless wrapped up in Bhuj by 23 May 2015. In June 2015, Hrithik started training to fight with tigers in one of the sequences of the film. A second, shorter outdoor schedule resumed in Bhuj in late summer and was completed by October 2015.

Another outdoor schedule of filming began in Jabalpur on 2 November 2015, where a fight sequence with crocodiles was completed on the banks of river Narmada at Bhedaghat.

In December 2015, the next schedule began at Film City in Mumbai, where most interior sets used for the film had been constructed. Unfortunately, however, an on-set accident during an action sequence in January 2016 tore two ligaments and severely sprained the ankle of lead actor Hrithik Roshan, which kept him home on crutches and doctor-ordered bed rest for two whole months before primary photography could resume in late March.

On 4 April 2016, the crew filmed the climax of the film at China Creek in Thane. Principal photography of Mohenjo Daro finally wrapped on 8 April 2016.

Post-production

Post-production of Mohenjo Daro was supervised by director Ashutosh Gowariker in conjunction with editor Sandeep Francis. Sound re-recording was performed at Futureworks by Justin Jose K. according to the sound design by Parikshit Lalwani and Kunal Mehta.  Digital intermediate was done by Prime Focus, colorist Makarand Surte. Visual effects were completed by the firm Drishyam VFX under the guidance of VFX consultant Karen Goulekas in conjunction with VFX supervisor Govardhan Vigraham.

On 3 August 2016, the Bombay High Court not only rejected into allegations by Akashaditya Lama that Mohenjo Daro (2016) film director Ashutosh Gowariker had stolen his script, but also "... imposed exemplary and punitive costs of Rs. 150,000 against Lama for putting false allegations and harassing makers of the film. The court has also slammed Lama for giving interviews, media articles and related material put on social media to harass the director and other stars of the film." Gowariker donated the entire fine received (approx. $2,246) to the Naam Foundation, a charity to benefit Maharashtra's drought-hit farmers.

India's mandatory Central Board of Film Certification cleared Mohenjo Daro for release without any cuts, awarding it a "U/A" certificate.

Soundtrack

The music for the film was composed by A. R. Rahman, marking his fourth collaboration with Gowariker, after Lagaan, Swades, and Jodhaa Akbar. The lyrics were penned by Javed Akhtar. The music rights were acquired by T-Series. The song album of the film was released on 6 July 2016.

Release
Mohenjo Daro released in 2600–2700 screens in India. Disney India announced in September 2016, that the company would end production of Bollywood films and instead would shift focus on releasing Disney films produced in the United States. Initially this film Announced to release on 14 January 2016, 19 December 2015 and 10 March 2016.

Locarno International Film Festival
Even before the film's theatrical release to the public, Mohenjo Daro had been honoured by selection as the Closing Film of the 69th Locarno International Film Festival in Switzerland. Thus on 13 August 2016, Mohenjo Daro was screened at the Piazza Grande, immediately before Locarno's award ceremony.

Special screenings
Mohenjo Daro was screened at the 45th Annual Conference on South Asia in Madison, Wisconsin (United States) on 23 October 2016. A special screening of the film was also arranged for the officials of the Information and Broadcasting Ministry in New Delhi on 18 September 2016.

Reception

Critical reception
On the review aggregation website Rotten Tomatoes the film has a rating of 43%, based on 7 reviews, with an average rating of 5/10. Metacritic, which uses a normalised rating, gives the film a score of 39 out of 100, based on 4 critics, indicating "generally unfavourable reviews".

Srijana Mitra Das of The Times of India gave the film a rating of 4/5 and wrote "Straight away, if you want to enjoy Mohenjo Daro, leave your disbelief by the door for Ashutosh Gowarikar's newest blast from the past only works as a fairy tale, not nailed in history, but hanging somewhere between Game of Thrones and Baahubali." Mumbai Mirror gave the film rating of 3/5 and termed Mohenjo Daro as good. Bollywood Hungama gave the film rating of 2.5/5 and wrote "Mohenjo Daro comes across as a grand historical fictional tale which appeals only in parts." Rachit Gupta of Filmfare gave the film a rating of 2.5/5 and wrote "Full marks to director Ashutosh Gowariker and the Mohenjo Daro team for making a film that’s detailed and a very good insight into the lost Indus Valley Civilisation. The close attention to detail, especially on the production design is the strength of this movie. If you’ve ever wondered what the ancient cities of Mohenjo-daro and Harappa must’ve looked like, this movie is a must watch."

Box office
Mohenjo Daro and clashed with Akshay Kumar's Rustom. Mohenjo Daro grossed  worldwide in its first 10 days. The film grossed  worldwide in its opening weekend. In addition to its box office gross, the film also earned  from satellite rights (450 million) and music rights (150 million).

India

Overseas
Mohenjo Daro grossed US$3.9 million in first 10 days in overseas. The film grossed $991,239 in North America.

Further reading

Accolades

See also
 Moriro
 List of Asian historical drama films

Notes

References

External links
 
 
 

2016 films
2010s historical romance films
Fiction set in the 21st century BC
Films directed by Ashutosh Gowariker
Films shot in Madhya Pradesh
Films shot in Gujarat
Films shot in South Africa
Films set in Sindh
Indian action adventure films
Indian historical adventure films
Indus Valley civilisation
Films scored by A. R. Rahman
Indian historical romance films
Films set in ancient India
UTV Motion Pictures films
Indian historical action films
2010s action adventure films
2010s historical adventure films
Films about unicorns
Films about crocodilians
Hindi-language action adventure films